Elm Grove is an unincorporated community in San Saba County, in the U.S. state of Texas. According to the Handbook of Texas, the community had a population of 15 in 2000.

History
Elm Grove was purported to be founded sometime before 1900. The 1930 county highway map showed a church and several homes. The church remained in 1964 while only the community itself was identified in 2000. It had a population of 15 that year.

Geography

Education
Elm Grove had a school called Post Oak School in the 1930s, which remained in 1964. Today the community is served by the Richland Springs Independent School District.

References

Unincorporated communities in San Saba County, Texas
Unincorporated communities in Texas